Luken Grosvenor Baker (born March 10, 1997) is an American professional baseball first baseman in the St. Louis Cardinals organization.

Amateur career
Baker attended Oak Ridge High School in Conroe, Texas, alongside Durbin Feltman. In July 2014, he won the Junior Home Run Derby at Target Field. He later won the Home Run Derby at the Under Armour All-America Baseball Game. As a senior, he was named the Gatorade Baseball Player of the Year.

Baker was considered an early round prospect for the 2015 Major League Baseball draft, but emailed major league teams telling them that he would not sign and would instead attend Texas Christian University (TCU) to play college baseball. The Houston Astros still selected him in the 37th round that same year, and he did not sign, enrolling at TCU.

In 2016, as a freshman at TCU, Baker was named the Big 12 Freshman of the Year. He started all 67 of TCU's games, batting .379 with 11 home runs and 62 RBIs. As a sophomore in 2017, Baker played 47 games before he suffered a left arm injury during a collision at first base that ended his season. In those 47 games, he batted .317 with eight home runs and 41 RBIs, earning him a spot on the All-Big 12 Second Team. Baker returned healthy in 2018 for his junior season, but his season was cut short again after 31 games after he fractured his left fibula and tore a ligament during a slide, requiring season-ending surgery.

Professional career
Baker was selected 75th overall by the St. Louis Cardinals in the 2018 Major League Baseball draft and signed with them for $800,000. He made his professional debut with the Gulf Coast League Cardinals, and, after batting .500 in eight games, and was promoted to the Peoria Chiefs. In 37 games for the Chiefs to finish the season, he hit .288 with three home runs and 15 RBIs.

Baker spent the 2019 season with the Palm Beach Cardinals. After hitting .346 with four home runs and a 1.067 OPS in the month of August, he earned Florida State League Player of the Month honors. He finished the year slashing .244/.327/.390 with ten home runs and 53 RBIs over 122 games. Baker was assigned to the Springfield Cardinals to begin the 2021 season. He missed nearly all of August and the beginning of September while on the injured list. Over 91 games for Springfield, Baker slashed .248/.322/.530 with 26 home runs and 68 RBIs. In mid-September, he was promoted to the Memphis Redbirds of the Triple-A East with whom he appeared in two games to end the season.

Baker returned to Memphis to begin the 2022 season.

References

External links

1997 births
Living people
People from Spring, Texas
Sportspeople from Harris County, Texas
Baseball players from Texas
Baseball first basemen
Baseball pitchers
TCU Horned Frogs baseball players
Gulf Coast Cardinals players
Peoria Chiefs players
Palm Beach Cardinals players